The 1988 UNLV Rebels football team was an American football team that represented the University of Nevada, Las Vegas in the Big West Conference during the 1988 NCAA Division I-A football season. In their third year under head coach Wayne Nunnely, the team compiled a 4–7 record.

Schedule

References

UNLV
UNLV Rebels football seasons
UNLV Rebels football